Thomas Hansen (born 18 January 1983) is a retired Danish footballer. He was a defender, who was used as a central defender as well as right back.

Career
Hansen played his youth football in Hvidovre IF and moved to Brøndby IF in 2003. He did not play regularly, and in his search for regular first team action he started looking elsewhere. He moved to AGF as of 1 January 2006 on a contract for 3 years. The contract was signed already in mid-2005, but the move was agreed to 2006 making him available on a free transfer. Hansen quickly settled in central defence, but in 2007 he lost his regular position. As of 1 February he had played 24 matches and scored 0 goals.

External links
 Danish national team profile
 Thomas Hansen on Soccerway

Living people
1983 births
Danish men's footballers
Hvidovre IF players
Brøndby IF players
Aarhus Gymnastikforening players
SønderjyskE Fodbold players
Danish Superliga players
Silkeborg IF players
Brønshøj Boldklub players
Association football defenders